Sarah Kendall (born 3 August 1976) is an Australian comedian from Newcastle, New South Wales. She won the Raw Comedy competition in 1998, regularly appeared on Australian television. She moved to the United Kingdom in 2000 at the age of 24.

Early life 
Kendall grew up in Newcastle, New South Wales and attended Merewether High School. She moved on to Sydney University at the age of 18. She began her career in 1996 partaking in the annual 'Review' show. Of it she said: “It started at university where there was a stand-up competition which some of my friends said I should do but I was too scared to do it. I was a genuine coward about it all and that in itself started to bug me, so eventually I got up on stage. I hated every single minute of it and was sick beforehand. But that made even more determined because I couldn’t work out why my fear was so disproportionate to the thing I was doing. It was just me talking for five minutes and so what if I got booed off stage. After about seven or eight years I eventually got it under control.”

Stand-up comedy
Kendall has performed solo shows at the Edinburgh Festival Fringe since 2003, with her 2004 show being nominated for the Perrier award. She has also performed in the Melbourne Comedy Festival since 2000.

Kendall talked about how she has reviewed her own comic response to a heckler who threatened her with sexual violence during a routine in an article in The Guardian on 2 August 2014. She said, "I built a routine around it – but looking back, I betrayed the seriousness of the incident". Kendall remarked that she dropped the routine because it started to sit uncomfortably with her.

Television and radio
Kendall has been a "special guest" on the BBC Radio 2 comedy show Parsons and Naylor's Pull-Out Sections.

She was part of an all-female sketch comedy show called Beehive also starring Alice Lowe, Barunka O'Shaughnessy and Clare Thomson, which was aired on E4.

She was a guest stand up comic on BBC Three's Russell Howard's Good News.

From 2010 she took the role of Libby McKenzie, an Australian character introduced in Series 6 of the BBC Radio 4 series Clare in the Community.

On 23 November 2012 Kendall appeared on BBC Radio 4's satirical news show The Now Show, and on 4 May 2015 appeared in The Vote Now Show, one of six election specials.

Kendall appeared on the Dave TV series Alan Davies: As Yet Untitled.

She was a guest on BBC Radio 4's Quote... Unquote on 21 September 2015.

In March 2017, her three-part series Sarah Kendall: Australian Trilogy was broadcast on BBC Radio 4. A second volume of Sarah Kendall's Australian Trilogy was aired in August 2018.

She has also appeared in Richard Herring's Leicester Square Theatre Podcast in 2021, in which Herring took issue with an article that suggested she met her husband at the Edinburgh fringe, she revealed that they in fact met at a Melbourne Comedy festival. She was also featured in a Georg Jensen commercial.

She appeared in the season finale episode of the first season of Motherland, originally aired on BBC2, as a nanny.

In 2019, Kendall created, wrote and starred in the comedy TV series Frayed, renewed in 2021.

Kendall was the winner of Series 11 of the comedy game show Taskmaster.

Personal life 
Kendall was married to Henry Naylor and has two children.

Awards

Filmography

References

External links

Australian women comedians
Living people
1976 births
People from Newcastle, New South Wales